Umm al Qubur is an abandoned village in Qatar, located in the municipality of Ash Shamal. Archaeological excavations have been carried out on the site. Its name translates to 'mother of graves'.

References

Al Shamal